Třebnouševes is a municipality and village in Jičín District in the Hradec Králové Region of the Czech Republic. It has about 300 inhabitants.

Administrative parts
Villages of Ostrov and Vinice are administrative parts of Třebnouševes.

References

Villages in Jičín District